5th Anti-Aircraft Missile Division of the Air Force() was activated on July 1, 1965, in Shanghai. The division was composed of 9 HQ-2 missile battalion, being responsible for the anti-air defense of the vicinity of Shanghai.

On April 1, 1976, the division was reduced to 1st Anti-Aircraft Missile Regiment of the Air Force().

In September 1985, the regiment merged with 3rd Antiaircraft Artillery Division of the Air Force and became 3rd Air Defense Composite Brigade().

References
中国空军地空导弹第五师, http://www.dser.com/lslt/tanke01/201410/00002283.html

Divisions of the People's Liberation Army
Air defence units and formations